The Gloria Record was an American rock band from Austin, Texas, a side-project of former Mineral vocalist Chris Simpson and bassist Jeremy Gomez. The group was formed it in 1997, together with guitarist Brian Hubbard and drummer Matt Hammon. They released two EPs through Crank! A Record Company, a self-titled EP (1999) and A Lull in Traffic (2000), before issuing their debut album Start Here through  Arena Rock Recording Company in 2002. While working on its follow-up, the group disbanded in May 2004.

History
After disbanding Mineral in 1997, frontman Chris Simpson and bassist Jeremy Gomez formed a new band. Guitarist Brian Hubbard and drummer Matt Hammon were brought into the fold sometime after. Hammon and Simpson were in a bar when the former asked "[W]hen are we going to get some songs together and do the Gloria record?" Instead of simply going with Gloria, Simpson opted for the Gloria Record as he felt it was a better name and less likely to confuse them with a Latin-American singer of the same name. A friend of the band's was in contact with Crank! A Record Company founder Jeff Matlow, who asked him if any new artists needed a label. When he got the band's 7" single, he called and offered to work with them. The self-titled EP was released on Crank! in November 1998. It was met with favorable reviews; the release was viewed as a continuation of Mineral, and drew comparisons to Sunny Day Real Estate and Radiohead. Later that year, Ben Houtman joined the group on piano/organ. Various US tours followed, and in 1999, Brian Malone replaced Hammon on drums.

Another EP, A Lull in Traffic, was released on Crank! in May 2000. It received favorable reviews, and saw the band toy with Pink Floyd-esque experimentation, earning a comparison to Radiohead. They released their debut studio album, Start Here in April 2002 through the Arena Rock Recording Co. label. It was recorded over many months in 2000-2001, and produced by Mike Mogis) at his Presto recording studio in Lincoln, Nebraska. It received generally favorable reviews; it saw the group moved away from their emo roots into an indie rock sound. It incorporated influences from U2 and R.E.M. and drew comparisons to How It Feels to Be Something On (1998) by Sunny Day Real Estate. Andrew Sacher of BrooklynVegan wrote that the album "seamlessly fus[es] elements of prog, psych, and baroque pop and mixing synthetic sounds with acoustic ones in a way that was totally modern". On May 26, 2004, the Gloria Record announced they would be breaking up. They had been working on their second album since July 2003, however, the sessions progressed slowly. Gomez and Hubbard went on to perform with Austin's The Glass Family and Chris Simpson pursuing solo projects under the name Zookeeper. UK label Big Scary Monsters released a 20th anniversary reissue of A Lull in Traffic in July 2020.

Members
Chris Simpson – vocals and guitar (1997-2004)
Ben Houtman – keyboards (1998-2004)
Jeremy Gomez – bass (1997-2004)
Brian Malone – drums (1999-2004)
Brian Hubbard - guitar (1997-2004)
Matt Hammon - drums (1997-1998)
Jeremy Tappero - drums (1998-1999)

Discography
Studio albums

Extended plays

Singles

Other appearances

Related projects
 Attention - Jeremy Tappero
 Gratitude - Jeremy Tappero
 Mineral - Chris Simpson, Jeremy Gomez
 The Stereo - Jeremy Tappero
 Zookeeper - Chris Simpson, Ben Houtman, Jeremy Gomez
 The Glass Family - Jeremy Gomez, Brian Hubbard
 Booher and the Turkeyz - Ben Houtman
 Ovenbirds - Jeremy Gomez, Brian Hubbard, Ben Houtman
 SWISS - Brian Malone, Brian Hubbard, Chris Simpson, Jeremy Gomez, Ben Houtman
 House and Parish - Brian Malone
 Suburban Eyes - Jeremy Gomez, Eric Richter, John Anderson

References

External links
  The Gloria Record's bio on their original label, Crank Records
 Gloria Record lyrics from first two EPs

1997 establishments in Texas
American emo musical groups
Arena Rock Recording Company artists
Indie rock musical groups from Texas
Musical groups from Austin, Texas
Musical groups established in 1997
Sadcore and slowcore groups